This is a list of newspapers in New South Wales in Australia.

List of newspapers in New South Wales (A)

List of newspapers in New South Wales (B)

List of newspapers in New South Wales (C)

List of newspapers in New South Wales (D)

List of newspapers in New South Wales (E–F)

List of newspapers in New South Wales (G)

List of newspapers in New South Wales (H)

List of newspapers in New South Wales (I–J)

List of newspapers in New South Wales (K–L)

List of newspapers in New South Wales (M)

List of newspapers in New South Wales (N–O)

List of newspapers in New South Wales (P)

List of newspapers in New South Wales (Q–R)

List of newspapers in New South Wales (S)

List of newspapers in New South Wales (T–V)

List of newspapers in New South Wales (W–Z)

See also
 List of newspapers in Australia
 List of student newspapers in Australia
 Media of Australia
 Media in Sydney

References

New South Wales
 
New South Wales-related lists